

The following is a list of mayors of the city of Becerril, Colombia.

See also

List of Governors of the Cesar Department

Notes

External links
 Becerril official website

Politics of Becerril
Politics of Colombian municipalities
Mayors, Becerril